Guyana is a country in the Guianas, South America.

Guyana, Guiana, or Guayana may refer to:

 French Guiana, an overseas department of France in the Guianas
 The Guianas, a region in the north of South America
 Guayana Region, an administrative region of Venezuela
 Ciudad Guayana, a city in Bolívar State, Venezuela
 Guayana language or Wayaná, an extinct Jê language of southern Brazil
 Guayana or Wayana language, a Cariban language spoken in Surinam, French Guiana, and Brazil
 Guiana Island, Antigua and Barbuda
 Guyana (1966–1970)
 Guiana Highlands, a mountainous area in the Guianas
 Guiana Shield, a geological craton of precambrian crust

See also 
 
 
 
 Guyenne
 Guinea (disambiguation)
 Wayana people